John Hennigan was an Irish politician and farmer. He was first elected to Dáil Éireann as a Cumann na nGaedheal Teachta Dála (TD) for the Leitrim–Sligo constituency at the 1923 general election. He was re-elected at each subsequent election until lost his seat at the 1933 general election. He was a member of Sligo County Council from 1928 to 1942.

References

Year of birth missing
Year of death missing
Cumann na nGaedheal TDs
Fine Gael politicians
Members of the 4th Dáil
Members of the 5th Dáil
Members of the 6th Dáil
Members of the 7th Dáil
Politicians from County Sligo
Irish farmers